Ralph Edwards (7 June 1935 – 13 October 2019) was an Australian rules footballer who played with Footscray in the Victorian Football League (VFL).

Notes

External links 		
		
		
		
		
		
		
2019 deaths
1935 births		
		
Australian rules footballers from Victoria (Australia)		
Western Bulldogs players
Daylesford Football Club players